Mount Suess is a conspicuous mountain (1,190 m) surmounting the south part of Gondola Ridge, near the south side of Mackay Glacier in Victoria Land. It was discovered by the British Antarctic Expedition (1907–09) and is named after Eduard Suess, an Austrian geologist and paleontologist.

Mountains of Victoria Land
Scott Coast